"Here Am I" is a song by Australian-New Zealand group Dragon, released on 5 June 1989 as the third single from the group's ninth studio album Bondi Road (1989). "Here I Am" peaked at No. 77 on the ARIA charts.

Track listing 
 "Here Am I" (Marc Hunter, Alan Mansfield) – 5:19	
 "Good Time Girl" (Alan Mansfield, Sharon O'Neill) – 5:07

Charts

References 

Dragon (band) songs
Songs written by Marc Hunter
1989 songs
1989 singles